The Family Jewels Tour is the first major headlining concert tour by Welsh singer-songwriter Marina Diamandis, known professionally as MARINA (formerly known as Marina and the Diamonds) in support of her debut album, The Family Jewels. In December 2009, prior to the release of her album, she announced an eight-date concert tour for the United Kingdom in February 2010. Following the success of her British tour, with tickets selling out, Diamandis announced her second United Kingdom and Ireland tour, entitled The Gem Tour. Tour dates for the United States and mainland Europe, in countries such as France, Germany, the Netherlands and Switzerland, were shortly added. In May 2010, Diamandis announced sixteen dates for her third United Kingdom and Ireland tour in Autumn the following year. Marina announced on 14 October that her third headlining UK tour would be called The Burger Queen Tour.

Diamandis also performed at several music festivals in the United States (SXSW 2010 and "Lilith Fair 2010"), the United Kingdom ("The Great Escape 2010", "Radio 1's Big Weekend 2010", "Isle of Wight Festival 2010", "Glastonbury Festival 2010", "iTunes Festival 2010" and "The Secret Garden Party 2010"), Germany ("Hurricane Festival 2010" and "Southside Festival 2010"), Norway ("Øyafestivalen 2010"), Sweden ("Way Out West Festival 2010"), Finland ("Flow Festival 2010") and Belgium ("Pukkelpop Festival 2010").

Diamandis was originally scheduled to play several shows in the USA in early 2011 but these dates were cancelled in order for her to work on the recording of Electra Heart. In Summer 2011, she switched back-and-forth between headlining "The Family Jewels Tour" and serving as an opening act for Katy Perry on her "California Dreams Tour".

Reception
Katy Ratican from Contact Music rated Marina and the Diamonds' Manchester concert on 21 February 2010 nine stars out of ten saying it "was impressively cohesive and Marina held the limelight with charisma and confidence". She also predicted that the "next time [Diamandis] plays Manchester, it will be to a sold out Academy 2 audience, with a top-selling album gracing the merchandising stand. Marina won't be playing to a few hundred people above a trendy bar in the foreseeable future." Joanne Dorken from MTV UK praised Diamandis' performance of "Obsessions" at London's Bush Hall on 23 February 2010 calling it the "highlight of the evening as Marina proved her vocal ability as well as showcasing her talent for playing live."

At the opening concert of her Gem Tour at The Glee Club in Birmingham on 12 May 2010, Zak Edwards from Gig Junkies said Diamandis "instantly captivated the crowd in a similar way to which Kate Bush and Toyah Willcox did in yesteryear." He concluded by saying: "In short, this was a great set by a really novel, unique and entertaining performer. If you get chance to see her, you really must."

Opening acts
Clock Opera (14—19 February 2010)
Alan Pownall (21—23 February 2010)
Samuel (14—15 March 2010)
Spark (now known as Jessica Morgan) (12—31 May 2010)
Jasmine Ash (6 July 2010)
DJs Aaron and Nako (8 July 2010)
Young the Giant (6 September 2010)
 CocknBullKid
 Hannah Yadi – (14 November 2010)
 Hollywood Kill
 Ra Ra Rasputin – 16 June 2011

Setlist
{{hidden
| headercss = background: #ccccff; font-size: 100%; width: 70%;
| contentcss = text-align: left; font-size: 100%; width: 70%;
| header = Leg 1: United Kingdom (February 2010), Leg 2: North America (March 2010) and Leg 3: Europe (April 2010)
| content = 
"Girls"
"Seventeen"
"The Outsider"
"I Am Not a Robot"
"Oh No!"
"Numb"
"Obsessions"
"Rootless"
"Hollywood"
"Shampain"
"Guilty" (only on 29 April 2010)
Encore
"Mowgli's Road"
}}
{{hidden
| headercss = background: #ccccff; font-size: 100%; width: 70%;
| contentcss = text-align: left; font-size: 100%; width: 70%;
| header = Leg 3: The Gem Tour (May 2010)
| content = 
"Girls"
"Seventeen"
"The Outsider"
"I Am Not a Robot"
"Oh No!"
"Numb"
"Obsessions"
"Rootless"
"Hollywood"
"Shampain"
"Guilty"
Encore
"Starstrukk"
"Are You Satisfied?" (latter part of the tour)
"Mowgli's Road"
}}
{{hidden
| headercss = background: #ccccff; font-size: 100%; width: 70%;
| contentcss = text-align: left; font-size: 100%; width: 70%;
| header = Leg 4: The Burger Queen Tour
| content = 
"The Family Jewels"
"The Outsider"
"Girls"
"Seventeen"
"Are You Satisfied?"
"Rootless"
"Hermit the Frog"
"I Am Not a Robot"
"Obsessions"
"Jealousy"
"Oh No!"
"Shampain"
"Mowgli's Road"
"Guilty"
Encore
"Numb"
"Hollywood"
}}

Tour dates

A ^ this concert was a part of "The Great Escape Festival 2010"
B ^ this concert was a part of "Isle of Wight Festival 2010"
C ^ this concert was a part of "Hurricane Festival 2010"
D ^ this concert was a part of "Southside Festival 2010"
E ^ this concert was a part of "Glastonbury Festival 2010"
F ^ this concert was a part of "iTunes Festival 2010"
G ^ this concert was a part of "Øyafestivalen"
H ^ this concert was a part of "Way Out West Festival"
I ^ this concert was a part of "Flow Festival 2010"
J ^ this concert was a part of "FM4 Frequency Festival"
K ^ this concert was a part of "Pukkelpop"
L ^ this concert was a part of "Pukkelpop"
M ^ this concert was a part of "Reading Festival"
N ^ this concert was a part of "Leeds Festival"
O ^ this concert was a part of "SWR3 New Pop Festival"

Box office score data

External links
Official website » Shows

References

Marina Diamandis concert tours
2010 concert tours
2011 concert tours
Concert tours of Australia
Concert tours of Canada
Concert tours of Europe
Concert tours of France
Concert tours of Germany
Concert tours of Ireland
Concert tours of North America
Concert tours of Oceania
Concert tours of the United Kingdom
Concert tours of the United States